Katherine G. Leonard (born August 1, 1959) is a Judge of the Hawaii Intermediate Court of Appeals.

Education

Leonard received her undergraduate degree from the University of Wisconsin–Parkside, and her Juris Doctor from the William S. Richardson School of Law at the University of Hawaii.

Legal career

After graduating law school she was a law clerk for Justice Robert Klein. In 1992, Leonard joined the law firm of Carlsmith Ball LLP, where she was a partner for over ten years prior to her judicial appointment. As a lawyer, she practiced in complex commercial, financial, real estate, environmental, trust and business law litigation and dispute resolution.

Service on the Hawaii Intermediate Court of Appeals

She was nominated to the court by former Governor Linda Lingle in November 2007 to fill the seat vacated by the death of Judge John Lim; she was confirmed unanimously by the Hawaii State Senate. She was sworn in as an Associate Judge of the Intermediate Court of Appeals on January 30, 2008.

Memberships and awards

Leonard is a member of the American Judicature Society. She also participates in the American Bar Association Appellate Judges Conference.  She is a member of the American Bar Association and the Hawaii State Bar Association.

Personal life

She is married to Ian Sandison and has one son and two stepchildren.

References

External links

Official Biography on Court of Appeals website

Living people
1959 births
20th-century American lawyers
21st-century American judges
21st-century American lawyers
Hawaii Democrats
Hawaii lawyers
Hawaii state court judges
People from Honolulu
William S. Richardson School of Law alumni
University of Wisconsin–Parkside alumni
20th-century American women lawyers
21st-century American women lawyers
21st-century American women judges